Magdalena Moons (24 January 1541, The Hague – 15 June 1613, Utrecht) was famous for her role during the Dutch war of liberation, when she saved the city of Leiden during its first siege by Spain in 1574.

Moons was a Catholic, the daughter of the judge Pieter Moons. She promised the 30-year older Spanish commander, Francisco de Valdez (1511-1580), to marry him if he stopped Spanish attacks on the starving city for a while, as her relatives were there, with the result that reinforcements were given time to arrive and the siege was broken.

The story was famous in its time and often told by both sides during the war.

References

External links

1541 births
1613 deaths
Dutch people of the Eighty Years' War
People from The Hague